Neopalpa neonata is a species of moth in the family Gelechiidae. It is found in southwest of North America, where it has been recorded throughout most of California, Arizona and the most western regions of Northern Mexico.

The other species in the genus Neopalpa is Neopalpa donaldtrumpi.

References

Gnorimoschemini
Moths of North America
Moths described in 1998